Temario "Temy" C. Rivera is a Filipino educator. Rivera was formerly professor of political science at the University of the Philippines Diliman, where he served as Chair of the Department of Political Science from 1993 to 1998. He was educated at the University of the Philippines Diliman (A.B., M.A.) and the University of Wisconsin–Madison (Ph.D.) In 1994, he authored the prize-winning book, Landlords and Capitalists: Class, Family and State in Philippine Manufacturing (published by the University of the Philippines Press).

Landlords and capitalists
Patently Marxist and combining Philippine elite historiography, his analysis in Landlords and Capitalists implicitly accepted the theoretical line of semi-feudal and semi-colonial of the Philippine revolutionary left, demonstrating that the social structure and economic topography of the Philippines is exhibiting hybrid features of capitalism and feudalism. The hybridity of this socio-economic architecture in a context of a weak state formation often captive by robust traditional social forces (clans, families) has caused and sustained the inequitable distribution of economic and political power in the Philippine society (described by Walden Bello as an "immobile class structure that is one of the worst in Asia") and the harnessing of democratic efforts towards patently conservative objectives such as obstructionist policies on land reform, inadequate social service, and anti-labor inclination among others. Rivera also faulted this unique feature for the continuing developmental morass that afflicts the Philippines, despite the fact that most of its neighbors in the Southeast Asian region have significantly achieved substantive development as newly industrialized economies.

Currently residing in Japan, he is professor of comparative politics at the International Christian University in Tokyo. He has also served as the editor in chief of the Philippine Political Science Journal since 1993.

References

External links
DAP profile

Year of birth missing (living people)
Living people
University of Wisconsin–Madison alumni
University of the Philippines alumni
Academic staff of the University of the Philippines
Filipino political scientists
20th-century Filipino historians
Political science journal editors
Filipino expatriates in the United States
Filipino expatriates in Japan
21st-century Filipino historians
Philippine Collegian editors